St Mary's or St Mary is the name of a number of electoral wards including:

 St Mary's (Trafford ward), Greater Manchester, England
 St Mary's, Isles of Scilly, a ward (as well as an island and civil parish)
 St Mary's (Chepstow ward), in Monmouthshire, Wales

 St Mary (Brecon electoral ward), Powys, Wales

 Sainte-Marie (electoral district), Quebec, Canada